The men's 5000 metres at the 2017 World Championships in Athletics was held at the London Olympic Stadium on .  This race was announced as the last track race of Mo Farah's career as he intends to focus on marathon running and road racing.  Farah had been in every final since 2007, winning three straight since 2011.

Summary

In the final, Farah (GBR) started faster than normal, after the pack congealed landing in second place behind Paul Chelimo (USA) who ran around the crowd to get to the front. Chelimo took the field through an aggressive 62 second lap. The second lap was a decidedly more relaxed 71 seconds, bringing Andrew Butchart (GBR) to the front, to look at Chelimo then take the point with his teammate Farah in tow. But Butchart didn't increase the pace, instead it slowed slightly to 72 seconds. Muktar Edris (ETH) came forward. After running shoulder to shoulder with Farah for 200 metres, Edris went out into the lead, but the pace didn't quicken. After another slow lap, he slowed and left Farah exposed on the front. 17 year old 2016 World Junior Champion Selemon Barega came from the back of the pack to take the lead. Barega increased the pace opening up several metres on Farah at the head of the pack with a 65 second lap, then he slowed again an Ethiopian leaving Farah exposed on the front of the pack. Another 66 second lap as Chelimo came back to take a turn at the front.

With five laps to go Patrick Tiernan ran around the field to take the lead. Tiernan moved the pace up to 64 seconds but the rest of the field didn't chase, letting him break away to a 10 metre lead. The next lap was under 63 seconds, with Yomif Kejelcha (ETH) coming to the front of the pack but leaving Farah to lead the group. Into the last two laps, a time when Farah does not like to get passed, he stayed ahead of Kejelcha, the overall quicken pace overtaking Tiernan with 600 metres to go. Shortly after passing Tiernan, Butchart rushed forward to get on Farah's shoulder to form a British wall similar to the ending stages of the Olympics. Through the turn, Kejelcha fought his way around the outside of the wall and onto the homestretch to take the lead going into the bell with the rest of the Ethiopian team, Edris and Barega lining up on the outside, next to Farah, Mohammed Ahmed (CAN), and Chelimo on the inside. At the bell, Edris was shoulder to shoulder with Farah.

Through the penultimate turn, Edris got ahead of Farah and onto the back of Kejelcha. The two Ethiopians opened up a 2 metre lead on Farah on the backstretch, leaving Farah in the unfamiliar position of having to sprint to catch up. But Chelimo had more speed, catching Farah from behind and moving to his outside shoulder as they gained on the Ethiopian duo, effectively leaving Farah boxed in on the curb. Coming off the final turn, Farah was looking for running room, which suddenly materialized in front of him as Kejelcha drifted out. Edris sprinted away from his teammate while Farah was still weaving his way past Kejelcha, with Chelimo going the outside route, both two metres behind Edris. Farah's race was for second place, with Edris expanding his lead to the finish. Farah was able to barely hold off Chelimo for silver. Unlike the spring in his step following his previous string of victories, it was Farah lying exhausted on the track.

Records
Before the competition records were as follows:

No records were set at the competition.

Qualification standard
The standard to qualify automatically for entry was 13:22.60.

Schedule
The event schedule, in local time (UTC+1), is as follows:

Results

Heats
The first round took place on 9 August in two heats as follows:

The first five in each heat ( Q ) and the next five fastest ( q ) qualified for the final. The overall results were as follows:

Final
The final took place on 12 August at 20:21. The results were as follows (photo finish):

References

5000
5000 metres at the World Athletics Championships